Fahreh is a village in Farsesh Rural District, in the Central District of Aligudarz County, Lorestan Province, Iran. At the 2006 census, its population was 800, in 159 families.

References 

Towns and villages in Aligudarz County